WZPA-LD, virtual channel 33 (UHF digital channel 32), is a low powered HSN2-affiliated television station serving Philadelphia, Pennsylvania, transmitting from the Roxborough antenna farm. The station is owned by HC2 Holdings.

History
Before the first license was granted, the FCC granted numerous construction permits and CP extensions in Camden, New Jersey:

On August 4, 1998, FCC issued new station JF0415DX call signs W33BT and W68CV.

On April 1, 1999, William E. Mattis, Jr. sold the construction permit to Mediacasting of Greenville, Delaware.

Between November 6, 2003 and Mid 2004, W33BT was silent.

January 9, 2007, WXSI-LP granted modification.

On April 28, 2005, W33BT's call sign changed to WXSI-LP.

On July 20, 2006, WXSI-LP was granted an STA to operate at ERP 1.5 kW, because transmitter broke down and using a replacement.

On October 2, 2006, Mediacasting sold WXSI-LP to Mako Communications of Corpus Christi, Texas.

Between December 7, 2006 through January 3, 2007, WXSI-LP went silent after terminated its lease and completion of construction permit at Roxborough, Philadelphia antenna farm.

On February 19, 2007, WXSI-LP's call sign was changed to WZPA-LP.

Between July 1 through October 10, 2009, WZPA-LP was silent when lost its network affiliation.

On July 16, 2012, WZPA-LP's call sign was changed to WZPA-LD.

In June 2013, WZPA-LD was slated to be sold to Landover 5 as part of a larger deal involving 51 other low-power television stations; the sale fell through in June 2016. Mako Communications sold its stations, including WZPA-LD, to HC2 Holdings in 2017.

Digital television

Digital channels
The station's digital signal is multiplexed:

On about June 18, 2012, WZPA began digital programming with four subchannels, while DT1 became CUBANA without programming.
On June 19, 2012, WZPA added a fifth subchannel with Azteca programming.

On June 30, 2012, DT1 began broadcasting Cubana de Television programming.

On October 2, 2012, added a sixth subchannel with color bars, and the next day, it began Peace TV programming.

About February 24, 2013, WZPA added a seventh subchannel with Azteca America programming.

Sometime between February 28 through March 20, 2013, DT1 started carrying QVC programming.

Sometime between March 20–28, 2013, DT5 had no programming.

Analog-to-digital conversion

On October 8, 2010, WZPA-LP converted from analog to digital.

References

External links 
 
 
 Mako Communications website

ZPA-LD
Television channels and stations established in 1998
Low-power television stations in the United States
LATV affiliates
Innovate Corp.